Cop4 or COP4 may refer to:
 1998 United Nations Climate Change Conference
 Cubebol synthase, an enzyme
 Beta-copaene synthase, an enzyme
 Beta-cubebene synthase, an enzyme
 (+)-sativene synthase, an enzyme

 the Transport Canada LID for Orilla/Pumpkin Bay Water Aerodrome